Army of the Republic may refer to:

Army of the Republic, an alternative name of the British New Model Army (1645–1660)
Army of the Republic, a fictional army and aerospace force of clone troopers in the Star Wars franchise
The Army of the Republic, a novel by Stuart Archer Cohen.
The army of the Roman Republic
Grand Army of the Republic, a US Civil War veterans' organization